Long Story Short may refer to:

Fiction and poetry
 Long Story Short, short-story anthology by Elyse Friedman at Toronto Book Awards
 "A Long Story Short", by Shirley Hazzard in The New Yorker, July 26, 1976, O. Henry Award
 Long Story Short, short-story anthology by Gladys Bronwyn Stern 1939
 Long Story Short, poetry e-zine featuring Christine M. Rose, Michael R. Burch, and other poets

Film, theatre and TV
 "Long Story Short", 2007 episode of Animalia
 Long Story Short, 1989 play by Rona Munro
 Long Story Short, 2010 film featuring Whit Hertford, Matt L. Jones, and Nora Kirkpatrick
 Long Story Short, musical work produced by TheatreWorks in 2012
 Long Story Short, documentary on actress Jodi Long's family, directed by Patricia Richardson
 Long Story, Short, television drama with Lauren Collins and Katie Boland, 2013
 Long Story Short, one man show and DVD by Colin Quinn 
 Long Story Short with Leslie Wilcox, chat show on PBS Hawaii
 Long Story Short (2021 film), film written and directed by Josh Lawson

Music
The Bridges (band), a band which began as acoustic band Long Story Short

Albums 
 Long Story Short, an album by Clive Gregson, 2004
 Long Story Short, an album by One Block Radius, 2005
 Long Story Short, an album by Larry Goldings, 2007
 Long Story Short, an album by Massad, 2009
 Long Story Short, an album by Youth Alive Australia
 Long Story Short, an album by Barry and Holly Tashian, 2008
 Long Story Short (Illy album), 2009
 Long Story Short (Sada K. album), 2015
 Long Stories Short, an EP by Bayside, 2001
 Long Story Short, an EP by Jackson Harris, 2010
 Long Story Short, an EP by Phil Putnam, 2001

Songs 
"Long Story Short", a song by Black Milk from Tronic
"Long Story Short", a song by Marcellus Hall & The Hostages from Afterglow
"Long Story Short" (song), a song by Taylor Swift from Evermore